Katarina Anna-Maria Gospic (born 6 February 1984) is a Swedish scientist and author, who grew up in the Akalla district of Stockholm. Between 2002-11 she studied physiology and medicine at Karolinska Institutet. In 2011 she started the consulting business Brainbow Labs, where she works as an author, speaker and consultant.

In 2007, Gospic graduated with a MSc in Physiology and in 2009 earned her MD in medicine, both from the Karolinska Institutet. In 2011 Gospic graduated with a PhD from a course in cognitive neuroscience and studies in neuroeconomy on how our feelings work and what happens in the brain when we make decisions. In 2012, she wrote and published the popular-science book  Välj rätt! En guide till bra beslut at Brombergs förlag.

In 2014, she published her second book called Den sociala hjärnan (The social brain). With Martin Ingvar, she published a study indicating that humans have a born ability to react to injustices and that these reactions stem from the amygdala. In 2013 she presented an episode of the Sveriges Radio show Sommar i P1. In October 2014, she participated in the after show Sommarpratarna which was broadcast on SVT. In 2020 she published her eighth book called Digital Tsumani.

Bibliography
2011 – Neural Mechanisms of Emotional Regulation and Decision Making, (doktorsavhandling), Karolinska Institutet                
2012 – Välj rätt! En guide till bra beslut, Brombergs
2014 – Den sociala hjärnan, Brombergs

References

Living people
1984 births
Swedish non-fiction writers
Swedish women non-fiction writers
Writers from Stockholm